The 1987 U.S. Women's Open was the 42nd U.S. Women's Open, held July 23–28 at Plainfield Country Club in Edison, New Jersey, a suburb southwest of New York City.

Laura Davies won the first of her four major titles in an 18-hole Tuesday playoff over runners-up Ayako Okamoto and Joanne Carner. The final round concluded on Monday after rain delays. It was Davies' first victory in the United States, and she became the fourth international winner of the championship.

Following this year, the Women's Open was not played in the New York City area for over a quarter century, returning in 2013 at Sebonack on eastern Long Island. In that time, the winner's share of the purse grew over tenfold, from $55,000 to $585,000.

Past champions in the field

Made the cut

Source:

Missed the cut

Source:

Round summaries

First round
Thursday, July 23, 1987

Source:

Second round
Friday, July 24, 1987

Source:

Third round
Saturday, July 25, 1987

Source:

Final round
Monday, July 27, 1987

Play on Sunday was postponed due to heavy rain. 

Source:

Playoff 
Tuesday, July 28, 1987

Source:

References

External links
U.S. Women's Open - past champions - 1987

U.S. Women's Open
Golf in New Jersey
Sports competitions in New Jersey
Edison, New Jersey
Women's sports in New Jersey
U.S. Women's Open
U.S. Women's Open
U.S. Women's Open
U.S. Women's Open